Gino Gavioli (9 May 1923 – 19 November 2016) was an Italian comic artist, animator and comic writer.

Biography
Born in Milan, after graduating from the Brera Academy Gavioli debuted illustrating some comic series for the publisher Alberto Traini in collaboration with his fellow Paolo Piffarerio. During the World War II he served as a soldier, and he reprised the activity of illustrator only in 1948, drawing the series Nonno Bigio for Edizioni Alpe. 

In 1952 Gavioli started collaborating with the magazine Il Monello, and the same year he co-founded with Piffarerio and his brother Roberto "Gamma Film", a company considered a pioneer in the field of Italian animation which soon specialized in animation shorts for Carosello. In 1960 he collaborated with Corriere dei Piccoli, also illustrating many covers and taking care of the games column of the magazine, and in 1961 he started a fifty years long collaboration with Il Giornalino.  

Among Gavioli's best known comics series, Vita da cani (with Tiziano Sclavi as writer), Paco y Monolito, Sempronio, Il Lupo e l'Agnello  and Orlando lo strambo of which he was also author of the stories.

References

External links

 
 

1923 births
2016 deaths
Italian comics artists
Italian comics writers
Italian animators
Italian animated film directors
Italian animated film producers
Artists from Milan
Brera Academy alumni